Hoe refers to several varieties of raw food dishes in Korean cuisine, consumed with local diversity by Koreans of all classes since the Three Kingdoms of Korea (57 BC - 668 AD), or earlier.

Varieties 
There are uncooked hoe as well as blanched sukhoe.

Raw 

Hoe, the raw fish or meat dish, can be divided into saengseon-hoe, filleted raw fish, and yukhoe, sliced raw meat. Saengseon-hoe can be either hwareo-hoe made from freshly killed fish, or seoneo-hoe made using aged fish. Mulhoe is a cold raw fish soup.

Blanched 

Sukhoe is a blanched fish, seafood, meat, or vegetable dish. Ganghoe is a dish of rolled and tied ribbons made with blanched vegetables such as water dropworts and scallions.

Preparation 
Hwareo-hoe is prepared by filleting freshly killed fish, while seoneo-hoe is made with aged fish in a similar way as Japanese sashimi: removing the blood and innards and ageing the fish at a certain temperature before filleting. Fish or seafood hoe is often served with gochujang-based dipping sauces, such as cho-gochujang (chili paste mixed with vinegar) and ssamjang (chili paste mixed with soybean paste). Hoe is often eaten wrapped in ssam (wrap) vegetables, such as lettuce and perilla leaves. After eating hoe at a restaurant, maeun-tang (spicy fish stew) made with the bones, head, and the remaining meat of the fish, can be served as an add-on dish.

History

With the popularization of Buddhism in Korea, beginning in the middle of the Three Kingdoms period, and running late into the Goryeo Dynasty (918–1392), the consumption of fish and other meat products (including hoe) declined. As the influence of Buddhism waned in the late Goryeo Dynasty period, the consumption of hoe began to lose its stigma.

During the Joseon Dynasty, the state promoted Confucianism, and, as Confucius was known to have enjoyed eating raw meat, hoe consumption greatly increased.

Gallery

See also
Hoedeopbap
Kuai (dish)
Maeuntang
Namasu
Sannakji
Yusheng

References

External links

생선회의 역사와 정보

Korean meat dishes
Korean seafood dishes
Korean vegetable dishes
Uncooked fish dishes
Uncooked meat dishes